Khtsisi John the Baptist church Tsvimoeti church is a church in Georgia, Shida Kartli region, Khashuri municipality. It is 1.5 km from the village Khtsisi (Khashuri district).

History 
The church of John the Baptist is a hall-type church. In the inscription on the eastern façade is said that the church was built in 1002 in time of Bagrat III. The monument is considered one of the best examples of single-nave churches. The most important are the rich ornaments, bas-relieves with animal figures. The arcades and the upper parts of the church are broken down, in the south there is a small chapel-eukterion. The church has two entrances
from the south and from the west. There is only one window on the west, south and eastern walls. There are three arches on the eastern facade, the middle arch is taller then other arches. The same thing happens on the north and west facades. 

In 2006, Khtsisi John the Baptist church was indicated as a National Cultural Monuments of Georgia.

Literature  
 Description of Georgian historical and cultural monuments, volume 5. pages:460-462, Tbilisi; 1990.

References 

Immovable Cultural Monuments of National Significance of Georgia